The Hong Kong Senior Shield 2006–07, also known as the 2006–07 HKFA Choi Fung Hong Senior Shield , is the 105th staging of the Hong Kong's oldest football knockout competition.

The competition started on 10 December 2006 with 10 Hong Kong First Division clubs and concluded on 21 January 2007 with the final.

South China captured their 20th title of the competition after beating Xiangxue Sun Hei by 2-1 in the final.

Teams
Citizen
Happy Valley
HKFC
Hong Kong 08
Rangers
Kitchee
Lanwa Redbull
South China
Wofoo Tai Po
Xiangxue Sun Hei

Squads

Fixtures and results
All times are Hong Kong Time (UTC+8).

Bracket

First round

Quarter-finals

Semi-finals

Final

Scorers
2 goals
  Jaimes Mckee of HKFC
  Tales Schutz of South China
  Wong Chun Yue of South China
  Lico of Xiangxue Sun Hei

1 goal
  Festus Baise of Citizen
  Tsang Kam To of Hong Kong 08
  Poon Man Tik of Happy Valley
  Sham Kwok Keung of Happy Valley
  Liu Jie of Lanwa Redbull
  You Long of Lanwa Redbull
  Wilfed Bamnjo of Kitchee
  Au Wai Lun of South China
  Cheng Siu Wai of South China
  Detinho of South China
  Li Haiqiang of South China
  Yeung Ching Kwong of South China
  Barnes Colly Ezeh of Xiangxue Sun Hei
  Lo Chi Kwan of Xiangxue Sun Hei

Prizes

Teamwise
 Champion (HKD$80,000): South China
 1st-Runner-up (HKD$20,000): Xiangxue Sun Hei
 Knock-out in the Semi-Finals (HKD$10,000 each): Kitchee, Lanwa Redbull
 Knock-out in the Preliminary (HKD$5,000 each): HKFC, Hong Kong 08, Wofoo Tai Po, Happy Valley, Rangers, Citizen

Individual
 Top Scorer Award (HKD$5,000 shared among 4 people): Tales Schutz, Wong Chun Yue (South China), Lico (Xiangxue Sun Hei), Jaimes Mckee (HKFC)
 Best Defender Award (HKD$5,000): Cristiano Cordeiro (Xiangxue Sun Hei)

See also
Hong Kong Senior Shield
The Hong Kong Football Association
2006-07 in Hong Kong football
Hong Kong FA Cup 2006-07
Hong Kong First Division League 2006-07
Hong Kong League Cup 2006-07

References

External links
 Fixtures at HKFA.com

Hong Kong Senior Challenge Shield
Shield
Hong Kong Senior Shield